Bushehr County is in Bushehr province, Iran. The capital of the county is the city of Bushehr. At the 2006 census, the county's population was 216,087 in 53,173 households. The following census in 2011 counted 258,906 people in 68,819 households. At the 2016 census, the county's population was 298,594 in 85,523 households.

Administrative divisions

The population history and structural changes of Bushehr County's administrative divisions over three consecutive censuses are shown in the following table. The latest census shows two districts, two rural districts, and four cities.

References

 

Counties of Bushehr Province